The Anti-Capitalist Muslims, also known by their official name Association for Struggle Against Capitalism, is a Turkish Islamic left-wing political organisation. They advocate a spiritual form of socialism, believing that the teachings of the Qur'an and Muhammad are not only compatible with, but actively promote the leftist principles of equality and distributism, drawing inspiration from the early Medina welfare state. They openly challenged right-wing Muslims to read the Quran and, as they put it, "try to disprove the fact that it is leftist". They have on several occasions actively clashed with the Turkish police. The association initially gained fame for their involvement in the Gezi Park protests.

Ideology 
İhsan Eliaçık, the group's leader, believes that it is mandatory per Quranic verse 4:136 for all Muslims to donate everything they do not use. He stated in an interview that he believes the Islamic duty is not just caring for the poor, but overthrowing the "capitalist devilish system" that he thinks makes them poor, "just like the Islamic prophets overthrew the devilish systems of their times". He continued by saying that they want a world without exploitation and privileges.

He claimed that many use Islam to advance their interests, and countries such as Saudi Arabia, Pakistan and Afghanistan all interpret Islam with an "extreme understanding". When asked about secularism, he stated that Classical secularism excludes the holy book; and an alternative way can be found.

He advocates for a "borderless world of peace". On evolution, he commented that it is a matter for science to discuss, not religion, and that Islam will never be proven wrong anyways. On polygamy, he stated that the verses about polygamy are widely misunderstood and that Islam is strictly against the practice.

He has been accused of being a communist, he responded to these claims by saying that they criticize capitalism on its essence while they criticize socialism by method. He says, while they agree with the fundamental teachings of socialism, they criticize the practical implementations, such as the political experiences of the Soviet Union.

Manifesto 
The organisation's manifesto, published in 2012, starts from the observation that "humanity is in need" and that Mammon, the ancient deity of gold, has metaphorically returned as the god of capitalists in the modern times, and a Muslim should not take gods other than Allah. It follows, "Capitalism is the enemy of God. It is the enemy of humanity, of nature, of the poor, of the hungry, of the oppressed."

The word Muslim is presented as being anti-capitalist by definition:

The manifesto cites the Quran as the only source.

Ali Shariati serves as the "chief influence" on the organization's ideology.

Actions and positions 
The organization took part in the demonstrations of May 1 where, like other peaceful protesters, its members were the object of police repression and were taken into police custody.

In 2012, a spokesperson for the organization said in an interview that Turkey "must apologize" about the fate that was reserved for the Armenians, the Kurds and the Alevis.

The association initially gained fame in July 2013 for their involvement in the Gezi Park protests. During the protests, the organization set up public picnics in green spaces to celebrate iftar. Members of several opposition political parties participated and showed their support for the action. Muslims from various parts of Turkey and the Turkish diaspora supported the movement, and collective prayers were held in the area, while they prayed, allied groups stood guard protecting them against the police and took turns in prayer.

Following the January 2015 attacks in France, the organization issued a condemnation on Twitter: "...Obviously, insulting a belief or a value can not justify a massacre... We do not accept these murders, as much as we do not accept the insults done to our prophet..."

In 2016, they held a prayer event for workers who have lost their lives.

Slogans 
The organisation has various slogans, some of which are:

  (God, bread, freedom)
  (All property belongs to God alone)
  (Those who enforce justice by defending themselves when wronged.) (Quran 42:39)
  (We wanted to help those who were oppressed on earth, and to turn them into leaders, and make them the inheritors.) (Quran 28:5)

See also 

 Islamic socialism

References 

Anti-capitalism
Islam in Turkey
Islamic socialism
Liberal and progressive movements within Islam
Socialism in Turkey
Socialism
2012 establishments in Turkey